Yekkehbagh (also Romanized as Yekkehbāgh) is a village in Zangelanlu Rural District, Lotfabad District, Dargaz County, Razavi Khorasan Province, Iran. At the 2006 census, its population was 782, in 180 families.

References 

Populated places in Dargaz County